The city of Nizhny Novgorod, Russia, is divided into two parts (Upper City and Lower City), eight districts, which are in turn subdivided into micro-districts, and municipal settlements.

Upper City - historical and cultural part. Located on the right hilly bank of the Oka River. It is divided into three districts.

Lower City - an industrial and commercial area. Located on the left lowland bank of the Oka River. It is divided into five districts.

Upper City

Nizhegorodsky District

Prioksky District

Sovetsky District

Lower City

Avtozavodsky District

Kanavinsky District

Leninsky District

Moskovsky District

Sormovsky District

References

 
City districts of Nizhny Novgorod
Government of Nizhny Novgorod